Walter Palmer Thompson  (April 3, 1889 – March 30, 1970) was a Canadian academic and former President of the University of Saskatchewan.

Biography
Born near Decewsville, Ontario, he received a BA in 1910 from the University of Toronto, an MA in 1912 and a Ph.D. in 1914 both from Harvard University. In 1913 he joined the University of Saskatchewan as Professor and Head of the Biology Department. In 1934 he was appointed Dean of Junior Colleges; in 1938 he became Dean of Arts and Sciences; in 1942 he was Acting President; in 1948 he was Director of Summer School; and in 1949 he became President of the University. He retired in 1959. After he stepped down as university president, Thompson served as chair of the Advisory Planning Committee on Medical Care for the province of Saskatchewan.

In 1967 he was made a Companion of the Order of Canada.

See also
James Walter Thompson

References
 

1889 births
1970 deaths
Canadian university and college faculty deans
Harvard University alumni
Presidents of the University of Saskatchewan
Companions of the Order of Canada
Academic staff of the University of Saskatchewan
University of Toronto alumni